Ojo Feliz is an unincorporated community located in Mora County, New Mexico, United States.

References

Unincorporated communities in Mora County, New Mexico
Unincorporated communities in New Mexico